Benedetto Accolti  is the name of:
Benedetto Accolti the Elder (1415–1464), Italian jurist and historian
Benedetto Accolti the Younger (1497–1549), Italian cardinal

See also
Accolti (surname)